Seung-won, also spelled Sung-won, is a Korean masculine given name. Its meaning differs based on the hanja used to write each syllable of the name. There are 17 hanja with the reading "seung" and 46 hanja with the reading "won" on the South Korean government's official list of hanja which may be registered for use in given names.

People
People with this name include:

Han Seung-won (born 1939), South Korean writer.
Cha Seung-won (born 1970), South Korean actor
Lee Seung-won (born 1979), South Korean fencer 
Yang Seung-won (born 1985), South Korean football defender (Korea National League)
Yeo Seung-won (born 1984), South Korean football forward (K-League Classic)
Son Seung-won (born 1990), South Korean actor
Yoon Seung-won (born 1995), South Korean football midfielder (K-League Classic)

See also
List of Korean given names

References

Korean masculine given names